IBM SMS may stand for several IBM products, systems, or technologies:

Hardware 
 Standard Modular System

Operating systems 
 Data Facility Storage Management Subsystem (MVS)
 System Managed Storage in DFSMS for MVS